The Petersburg Tollhouse, now located in the hamlet of Addison, Pennsylvania, United States, was the first tollhouse that travelers encountered while on the National Road heading west into Pennsylvania. The Old Route 40 now sits atop the National Pike at this tollhouse. The Petersburg tollhouse is one of three surviving tollhouses for the National Pike; the remaining ones are the LaVale tollhouse located between Cumberland and Frostburg, Maryland and the Searight's tollhouse located just west of Uniontown on Route 40.

The toll house is owned by Great Crossings Chapter of the National Society Daughters of the American Revolution, and is open to visitors by appointment.

It was listed on the National Register of Historic Places in 1979.

References

External links
 
 Petersburg Toll House - Great Crossings Chapter, National Society Daughters of the American Revolution

Buildings and structures on the National Register of Historic Places in Pennsylvania
Historic American Buildings Survey in Pennsylvania
Houses completed in 1835
Transport infrastructure completed in 1835
Transportation buildings and structures in Somerset County, Pennsylvania
Toll houses on the National Register of Historic Places
National Register of Historic Places in Somerset County, Pennsylvania
Transportation buildings and structures on the National Register of Historic Places in Pennsylvania
Tourist attractions in Somerset County, Pennsylvania